Washington Village may refer to:

Washington Village, an area of Washington in the county of Tyne and Wear in northeast England
Washington Village, Baltimore, Maryland, also known as Pigtown, Baltimore, an area of the city of Baltimore, Maryland
Washington Village (Norwalk, Connecticut), public housing complex in Norwalk, Connecticut